In 1952, Frank Lloyd Wright completed his last Los Angeles building, the Anderton Court Shops, a small three-story group of shops on fashionable Rodeo Drive in the downtown section of Beverly Hills, California.

Design
The entrance to all the shops is off of an angular ramp that wraps around an open parallelogram as it leads upward to the shops. Four shops 
were envisioned with the penthouse space, an apartment. Like the Marin Civic Center, this is another example of a secular Wright building with a "steeple". The inverted “V” front elevation stands out in sharp contrast to its traditional, flat-front urban neighbors.

Present day
Since the Anderton Court Center's completion, the space has been subdivided. The complex now consists of six small shops, three on each side, each staggered a half-floor from one another and offset by the ramp. The facade, which was once light buff with oxidized-copper-color trim, has been painted white with black detailing. Today's canopy and signage are later additions, not consistent with Wright's original design.

The Anderton Court Shops are on the National Register of Historic Places.

See also
 History of the National Register of Historic Places
 List of National Historic Landmarks by state
 State Historic Preservation Office
 List of Registered Historic Places in Los Angeles County, California

References

 Storrer, William Allin. The Frank Lloyd Wright Companion. University Of Chicago Press, 2006,  (S.356)

External links

Anderton Court Shops on peterbeers.net
Anderton Court Shops on waymarking.com
 Office of Historic Preservation - California State Parks
 SEARCHING OUT WRIGHT'S IMPRINT IN LOS ANGELES
Photo on Arcaid

Frank Lloyd Wright buildings
Buildings and structures on the National Register of Historic Places in Los Angeles County, California
Commercial buildings on the National Register of Historic Places in California
Buildings and structures in Beverly Hills, California
Landmarks in Los Angeles County, California
Modernist architecture in California
Commercial buildings completed in 1952